Anja Eržen (born 26 October 1992)  is a retired Slovenian cross-country skier who has been competing since 2006. At the 2010 Winter Olympics in Vancouver, she finished 15th in the 4 × 5 km relay and 60th in the 7.5 km + 7.5 km double pursuit events.

Eržen has only two World Cup competitions as of March 2010 with a ninth-place finish in the 4 × 5 km relay in Norway in November 2009 and a 56th-place finish in a 15 km mass start event in December 2009. She has three victories at lesser events at 5 km in 2009 and 2010.

Cross-country skiing results
All results are sourced from the International Ski Federation (FIS).

Olympic Games

World Championships

World Cup

Season standings

References

External links

1992 births
Cross-country skiers at the 2010 Winter Olympics
Living people
Olympic cross-country skiers of Slovenia
Olympic biathletes of Slovenia
Slovenian female cross-country skiers
Slovenian female biathletes
Biathletes at the 2018 Winter Olympics